Holstebro is the main town in Holstebro Municipality, Denmark. The town, bisected by  Storåen ("The Large Creek") and has a population of 36,489 (1 January 2022).

History
The town arose at a ford by the creek, and later a bridge was erected. The name probably derives from holdested ved broen (lit, "a resting place by the bridge").

Holstebro was first mentioned in a letter from Bishop Thyge of Ribe in 1274. A large fire in 1552 destroyed many of the town's old buildings.

On 11 February 1962 parts of Holstebro were hit by a high-end F3/T7 tornado. This was the most devastating tornado in Denmark's history & 3rd strongest. The tornado travelled 13 km with a max width of 500 meters. More than 100 homes were damaged or destroyed. Large brick apartments had their roof torn off and large parts of their third storey destroyed. A concrete barn was entirely destroyed with only one to two exterior walls still standing, and a mobile home was tossed into the air. Damage cost reached 14 million DKK as of 1962, or about 188.9 mil dkk as of 2022 

Modern Holstebro
The town is a trading, industrial and cultural center in western Jutland. Industries include the manufacture of processed food, iron and machinery, wood and furniture, textiles and chemicals.

Holstebro has a large network of pedestrian walkways (gågader) in the town centre either side of the River Storå. This area has a varied shopping environment, enhanced by outdoor sculptures and picturesque buildings, including the town church and the Town Hall. The first sculpture purchased by Holstebro Municipality was Alberto Giacometti's sculpture "Maren on vehicle" purchased in 1966.

Holstebro has a rich and varied cultural life. Between 1997 and 2009 it hosted the internationally recognized ballet company Peter Schaufuss Ballet and the town still hosts the performance art theatre Odin Teatret. Several museums, including the Holstebro Art Museum with its collection of Danish and international contemporary art, and the Holstebro Museum can be found in the town.

The town holds an annual culture festival, the Holstebro Festive Week, in late summer. The Holstebro Hall, rebuilt in 1966, houses a music theatre, the Holstebro Convention and Culture Center (1991) and provides space for theatre presentations, concerts, exhibitions and conventions. More than 100 cultural events occur here every year, and the hall is visited by more than 100,000 people annually.

The Jutland Dragoon Regiment (Jydske Dragonregiment), which can trace its history back to 1679 in the times of King Christian V, has made Holstebro its home since 1953. The regiment is Holstebro's largest place of work with more than 1,800 employees.

Transport
Holstebro is served by Holstebro railway station. It is located on the Vejle-Holstebro and Esbjerg-Struer railway lines and offers direct InterCity services to Copenhagen and Struer and regional train services to Fredericia and Skjern.

Sport and leisure
Team Tvis Holstebro was founded in 2000 and play handball, representing Holstebro in the men's Danish Handball League and the Danish Women's Handball League. The women's team has won the Women's European Handball Federation cup twice, in 2012–2013 and 2014–2015 and were runner's up in 2010–2011. The team's best placing in the domestic league was 2nd in 2012–13 and, as a result, they competed in the qualification rounds of the 2013–14 EHF Women's Champions League, the highest level competition in Europe.

The men's handball team won the Danish Handball Cup in 2008 and have finished third in the domestic league three times, most recently in 2008. They achieved third place in the men's 2012–13 EHF Cup. Both teams play at Gråkjær Arena, a 3,250 capacity hall which can also be used for concerts. The arena is located to the north of the town center.

Holstebro Idrætspark, located to the north-east of the town centre, is a multi-use sports complex. A stadium on the site is home to Holstebro BK, the town's football club who play in the 4th tier of Danish football, the Denmark Series. The site also features playing fields, beach volleyball courts and a sports hall. A tennis centre, including an indoor hall and seven outdoor courts, adjoins the site and is the home of Holstebro Tennis Club. Holstebro RK play rugby union in the town.

It is allowed between 15 June and 31 October.

Jamboree Denmark 2012

A Danish national Scouting Jamboree took place near Holstebro in July 2012. Over 37,000 Scouts and Guides attended the event.

Notable people

The Arts 
 Karl Jensen (1851 in Holstebro – 1933) a painter of landscapes of northern Zealand
 Knud Agger (1895 in Holstebro – 1973) a self-taught painter, visionary and strongly existentialist
 Knud Hvidberg (1927 in Holstebro – 1986) a Danish painter and sculptor
 Henning Stærk (born 1949 in Holstebro) a Danish singer and musical-performer
 Thomas Søndergård (born 1969 in Holstebro) a Danish conductor
 Anne Fortier (born in 1971 in Holstebro) a Danish / Canadian writer, lives in Quebec
 Mikael Simpson (born 1974 in Holstebro) a songwriter, singer and film composer
 Iben Dorner (born 1978 in Holstebro) a Danish actress and voice artist 
 Simon Lynge (born 1980 in Holstebro) a singer-songwriter, raised in Greenland
 Elias Ehlers (born 1985 in Holstebro) a Danish stand-up comedian

Public thinking & Public Service 
 Charles Christian Lauritsen (1892 in Holstebro – 1968) an American physicist
 Cathrine Fabricius Hansen (born 1942 in Holstebro) a Danish-born Norwegian Germanist
 Else Marie Friis (born 1947 in Holstebro)  a botanist, paleontologist and academic
 Søren Gade (born 1963 in Holstebro) a politician, Minister of Defence 2004/2010
 Charlotte Sahl-Madsen (born 1964 in Holstebro) is a Danish politician and businesswoman
 Erik Poulsen (born 1967 in Holstebro) a Danish politician and MEP
 Claus Bundgård Christensen (born 1968 in Holstebro) an historian and academic
 Ove Christiansen (born 1969 in Holstebro) professor of chemistry at Aarhus University
 Jens Rohde (born 1970 in Holstebro) a Danish politician and MEP
 Simon Lynge (born 1980 in Holstebro) a singer-songwriter, grew up in Qaqortoq, Greenland

Sport 
 Bo Hansen (born 1972 in Holstebro) a Danish former footballer, 237 club caps
 Peter Heine Nielsen (born 1973) a chess grandmaster, five-time Danish Chess Champion.
 Jesper Damgaard (born 1975) a retired Danish professional ice hockey player 
 Carsten Svensgaard (born 1975 in Holstebro) a curler, competed at the 2002 Winter Olympics
 Claus Bech Jørgensen (born 1976 in Holstebro) a Faroese former footballer, over 340 club caps 
 Morten Skoubo (born 1980 in Holstebro) a retired footballer, over 300 club caps
 Jeppe Huldahl (born 1982 in Holstebro) a professional golfer, plays on the European Tour
 Soren "Bjergsen" Bjerg (born 1996 in Holstebro) a professional video gamer, six-time LCS champion, plays for TSM

Twin towns – sister cities
Holstebro practices twinning on the municipal level. For the twin towns, see twin towns of Holstebro Municipality.

References

 
Municipal seats of the Central Denmark Region
Municipal seats of Denmark
Cities and towns in the Central Denmark Region
Holstebro Municipality